The European Journal of Cancer Prevention (print: ,) is the official journal of the European Cancer Prevention Organization. It was established in 1991 and is published bimonthly by Lippincott Williams & Wilkins. The journal focuses on raising awareness of the various forms of cancer prevention as well as stimulating research and innovation. The articles cover a wide scope of field areas, including descriptive and metabolic epidemiology, histopathology, lifestyle issues, environment, genetics, biochemistry, molecular biology, microbiology, clinical medicine, intervention trials and public education, basic laboratory studies, and special group studies. The current editor in chief is prof. Giovanni Corso. According to the 2021 Journal Citation Reports the journal has an impact factor of 2.164, ranking it 217 of 245 journals in the category Oncology.

References

External links 

European Cancer Prevention Organization

Oncology journals
Bimonthly journals
Publications established in 1991
English-language journals
Lippincott Williams & Wilkins academic journals
1991 establishments in Europe